Luís Carlos Tóffoli, usually nicknamed Gaúcho (7 March 1964 – 17 March 2016), was a Brazilian football player (centre forward), manager and club president.

Career
Gaúcho was born in Canoas, Rio Grande do Sul. After spending his youth years at Rio de Janeiro club Flamengo, he began his professional career in 1984 at Grêmio. The following year he transferred to Atlético Goianiense. In 1986, he played for XV de Piracicaba, then a year later he moved to Santo André where he stayed until mid-1988.

From 1988 to 1989 he played for Palmeiras. On 17 November 1988, during a Campeonato Brasileiro Série A match against Flamengo, he was selected as replacement goalkeeper after Zetti suffered an injury. The match ended 1-1 after regular time; during the penalty shootout Gaúcho saved two Flamengo penalties, and Palmeiras won 5-4.

In 1990, he returned to his youth club, signing a three-year deal with Flamengo. There he won the 1990 Copa do Brasil, the 1991 Rio State Championship and the 1992 Série A. During this period he played 198 matches and scored 98 goals. At the end of his contract he joined Italian Serie A side Lecce, where he failed to make a breakthrough with only five games played. He left the club halfway through the season and signed with Boca Juniors, where once again he failed to repeat his good performances.

Back in Brazil, he joined Atlético Mineiro in 1994 where he played once again alongside his good friend Renato Gaúcho. In the following year, his last as a professional footballer, he played for Ponte Preta and Fluminense.

Cuiabá Esporte Clube

In 2001, he founded a football club called Cuiabá Esporte Clube. He was the club's first president and manager in the amateur era. Cuiabá Esporte Clube won the Mato Grosso state championship six times.

Death
Gaúcho died of prostate cancer on 17 March 2016.

Honors and achievements
Brazil Cup - 1990
Rio State Championship - 1991
Rio State Championship top goalscorer (17 goals) - 1991
Copa Libertadores top goalscorer (8 goals) - 1991
Série A - 1992

References

Enciclopédia do Futebol Brasileiro, Volume 1 - Lance, Rio de Janeiro: Aretê Editorial S/A, 2001.

1964 births
2016 deaths
People from Canoas
Brazilian footballers
Brazilian football managers
Campeonato Brasileiro Série A players
Serie A players
Brazilian expatriate footballers
Expatriate footballers in Italy
Expatriate footballers in Argentina
Brazilian expatriate sportspeople in Italy
Brazilian expatriate sportspeople in Argentina
Brazilian football chairmen and investors
Brazilian people of Italian descent
CR Flamengo footballers
Grêmio Foot-Ball Porto Alegrense players
Atlético Clube Goianiense players
Esporte Clube XV de Novembro (Piracicaba) players
Esporte Clube Santo André players
Sociedade Esportiva Palmeiras players
U.S. Lecce players
Boca Juniors footballers
Clube Atlético Mineiro players
Associação Atlética Ponte Preta players
Fluminense FC players
Cuiabá Esporte Clube managers
Mixto Esporte Clube managers
Luverdense Esporte Clube managers
Association football forwards
Deaths from cancer in São Paulo (state)
Deaths from prostate cancer
Outfield association footballers who played in goal
Cuiabá Esporte Clube
Sportspeople from Rio Grande do Sul